Ivan Frolov (born 21 September 1992) is a Russian Boccia player, who won bronze medal in the Mixed pairs BC4 event at the 2020 Summer Paralympics. 

He competed at the 2019 Olbia Boccia Regional Open, winning a gold medal.

References 

Living people
Medalists at the 2020 Summer Paralympics
Paralympic bronze medalists for the Russian Paralympic Committee athletes
1992 births